P. K. Hormis Tharakan, an Indian Police Service (IPS) officer of the Kerala cadre (1968 batch), was chief of the Research and Analysis Wing (R&AW), India's external intelligence agency, from 1 February 2005 to 31 January 2007. He is the former Director General of the Kerala Police.

Tharakan succeeded C. D. Sahay - a 1967 batch officer of the IPS's Karnataka cadre - on 31 January 2005.

He was one of the advisors to the governor of Karnataka, when the state was brought under the President's rule prior to Assembly elections in the state in 2008. He was a member of the National Security Council and was also the Chief Advisor of Strategic Affairs.

Tharakan comes from the Parayil family in Olavipe, Kerala.

References

Indian spies
Malayali people
Living people
People of the Research and Analysis Wing
Indian Police Service officers
Indian Christians
1947 births
Tharakan titleholders